Parnassius staudingeri hunza, the Karakoram banded Apollo, is a high-altitude butterfly which is found in India. It is a member of the genus Parnassius of the swallowtail family, Papilionidae. It was variously treated as a subspecies of P. delphius and a distinct species. The subspecies was first described by Grigory Grum-Grshimailo in 1888.

Description

Male upperside ground colour duller, more sullied white. Forewing: the discal band in typical specimens very much shorter, not extended below vein 5, but in all specimens observed, the discal band reaches vein 1, and where it crosses interspace 3 is joined onto the postdiscal transverse band by a broad cross-bar, that extends right up to the base of that interspace. Hindwing: the sub-terminal series of dark spots reduced to one or two near the tornus, the anterior spots (except the spot in interspace 7) replaced by a curved band of somewhat luuulur spots that extends unbroken between the spot in interspace 3 and that in interspace 7. Underside: similar to the underside in Parnassius stoliczkanus, with no red spots at the base of the hindwing; in a few specimens a discal and a subcostal black-encircled red spot are present. Antennae, head, thorax and abdomen as in stoliczkanus.

Range
It is seen in Afghanistan, Pakistan, northern India (including Jammu and Kashmir, Himachal Pradesh and Uttarakhand), western China (?), Tibet (?).

Status
It is widely distributed. Locally common, generally rare. Not known to be threatened. Requires further research. This butterfly is protected by law in India and was featured in the erstwhile USSR Red Data Book as being vulnerable.

See also
Papilionidae
List of butterflies of India
List of butterflies of India (Papilionidae)

Cited references

Other references
 
 
 
 
 Sakai S., Inaoka S., Toshiaki A., Yamaguchi S., Watanabe Y., (2002) The Parnassiology. The Parnassius Butterflies, A Study in Evolution, Kodansha, Japan. 
 Weiss Jean-Claude, (1999) Parnassiinae of the World, Hillside Books, Canterbury, UK. , 

staudingeri hunza
Fauna of Pakistan
Butterfly subspecies